Toxobotys is a genus of moths of the family Crambidae.

Species
Toxobotys aureans Rose & Kirti, 1989
Toxobotys boveyi Bänziger, 1987
Toxobotys praestans Munroe & Mutuura, 1968

References

Natural History Museum Lepidoptera genus database

Pyraustinae
Crambidae genera
Taxa named by Eugene G. Munroe